The 1985 Coupe de France Final was a football match held at Parc des Princes, Paris, on 8 June 1985 that saw AS Monaco FC defeat Paris Saint-Germain F.C. 1–0 thanks to a goal by Bernard Genghini.

Match details

See also
1984–85 Coupe de France

External links
Coupe de France results at Rec.Sport.Soccer Statistics Foundation
Report on French federation site

Coupe
1985
Coupe De France Final 1985
Coupe De France Final 1985
Coupe De France Final
Coupe De France Final